Bofanmun is a town in south-eastern Ivory Coast. It is a suburb of Abidjan and is the seat of the sub-prefecture of Brofodoumé. Bofanmun is about 15 kilometres northeast of Abidjan.

Notes

Populated places in Abidjan